The Rayoso Formation is a geological formation in the Neuquén Province of Argentina whose strata date back to the Aptian-Albian stages of the Early Cretaceous. Dinosaur remains are among the fossils that have been recovered from the formation.

Description 
The unit comprises sandstones deposited in a lacustrine environment.

Fossil content 
Indeterminate ceratosaurian remains located in Neuquén Province, Argentina.

See also 
 List of dinosaur-bearing rock formations

References

Bibliography

Further reading 

 J. F. Bonaparte. 1996. Cretaceous tetrapods of Argentina. Münchner Geowissenschaften Abhandlungen 30:73-130
 L. Salgado, J. I. Canudo, A. C. Garrido and J. L. Carballido. 2012. Evidence of gregariousness in rebbachisaurids (Dinosauria, Sauropoda, Diplodocoidea) from the Early Cretaceous of Neuquén (Rayoso Formation), Patagonia, Argentina. Journal of Vertebrate Paleontology 32(3):603-613

Geologic formations of Argentina
Lower Cretaceous Series of South America
Cretaceous Argentina
Aptian Stage
Sandstone formations
Lacustrine deposits
Formations
Fossiliferous stratigraphic units of South America
Paleontology in Argentina
Geology of Neuquén Province